Ronald Crawford may refer to:

Ronald Crawford (footballer), South African football player
Ronald Crawford (water polo) (born 1939), American water polo player 
Ronald Crawford (racewalker) (1936–2018), Australian racewalker
Ron Crawford (born 1945), American actor and artist
Sir Ronald Crawford, a Scottish knight who may have been hanged at the Barns of Ayr